Drachiella is a genus of marine red alga. It has scaly thickenings; also "rhizoids fringing openings".
It is found below the kelp zone in areas exposed to moderate wave action; it is iridescent, and consists of a short, narrow stipe broadening into midribless thalli which reach 7 cm in length. 
Drachiella exhibits diffuse intercalary and marginal growth, and rhizoids are common along the margins, which it uses for anchorage. Pit connections often link adjoining cells.

Distribution
Drachiella spectabilis has been recorded from Inistrahull in Ireland.

References

Red algae genera
Delesseriaceae